John Howe    was a Major League Baseball player. He played for the New York Giants of the National League in 1890 and 1893.

Sources

Baseball players from New York City
19th-century baseball players
Major League Baseball second basemen
New York Giants (NL) players
Scranton Indians players
Allentown Peanut Eaters players
Kansas City Cowboys (minor league) players
Newark Trunkmakers players
London Tecumsehs (baseball) players